Lucjan Żeligowski (17 October 1865 – 9 July 1947) was a Polish-Lithuanian general, politician, military commander and veteran of World War I, the Polish-Soviet War and World War II. He is mostly remembered for his role in  Żeligowski's Mutiny and as head of a short-lived Republic of Central Lithuania.

Biography
Lucjan Żeligowski was born on 17 October 1865 in Oszmiana, in the Russian Empire (modern Ashmiany in Belarus) to Polish parents Gustaw Żeligowski and Władysława Żeligowska née Traczewska. Before the Partitions of Poland in the late 18th century the town was part of the Polish–Lithuanian Commonwealth. After graduating from military officers' school located in Riga (1885), Żeligowski joined the Imperial Russian Army, where he served at various staff and command posts. He then married Tatiana Pietrova and had two children.
 
Żeligowski fought in the Russo-Japanese War of 1904-1905. During the First World War he served as a lieutenant colonel and commanding officer of an Imperial Russian rifle regiment.

Fighting against the Bolsheviks
After the February Revolution of 1917, Żeligowski became one of the organizers of the Polish Army in the former Russian Empire. Initially commander of an infantry regiment in the ranks of the Polish 1st Corps, he was quickly promoted and given command over a brigade. In 1918 he started the creation of a Polish unit in the area of Kuban, which eventually became the 4th Polish Rifle Division. As part of the Polish Army, his unit fought alongside the Denikin's Whites in the Russian Civil War. In October of the same year he became the Commander in Chief of all the Polish units fighting in Russia.

After the outbreak of the Polish-Bolshevik War and the defeat of Denikin, Żeligowski's unit was ordered to retreat to Romanian Bessarabia, where it took part in defence of the border against Bolshevik raids. Finally, in April 1919, the division was withdrawn to the newly established Second Polish Republic, where it was incorporated into the Polish Army and renamed to the Polish 10th Infantry Division.

During the war against the Bolshevist Russia, Żeligowski, a personal friend of Polish Marshal Józef Piłsudski, was quickly promoted to general and given the command over an operational group of his name, composed of his 10th division and additional units, mostly of partisan origin. As such, he soon became the commanding officer of the entire Lithuanian-Belarusian Front, operating in the area of Polesie and the Pinsk Marshes. During the Battle of Warsaw in 1920 his unit was attached to the 3rd Polish Army and took part in the pursuit of fleeing Bolshevik and Soviet forces at the Battle of the Niemen. Following the Battle of Warsaw, Żeligowski wrote:"There was a paradoxical situation .. when Warsaw was defended and the war was won, we, the citizens of our homeland - Lithuania, could not even return to the house where the Zhmudin people settled, protégé of the Germans ... Having lost Lithuania - Poland lost much of its statehood. Polish politicians didn't understand that, only every soldier, even a Lithuanian citizen, understood that."

Republic of Central Lithuania

In October 1920, Żeligowski, a native of historical lands of Lithuania, was chosen to command the 1st Lithuanian-Belarusian Infantry Division, composed mainly of P.O.W. members, volunteers and partisans from the territory of modern Belarus and Lithuania. On October 8, 1920, after a staged mutiny, he "defected" with his unit and took control over the city of Vilnius and its area. The mutiny, named after him, would be remembered as the defining moment of his life. On October 12, he proclaimed independence of the said area as Republic of Central Lithuania, with Wilno as its capital. Initially a de facto military dictator, after the parliamentary elections he passed his powers to the newly elected parliament, which in turn decided to submit the area to Poland.

According to Lucjan Żeligowski's point of view:"But not only geographically, Lithuania was the heart of the Slavs. It was morally. She, one of all the Slavic peoples, could easily talk with everyone. As with Poland, so with Russia, so with Ukraine. The mentality of the Lithuanian peoples was, as it were, created to reconcile everyone.

In the 14th-century Lithuanian Chronicles, there was written about mobilization in Ašmena, where it was mentioned that Jokūbas Želigovskis had a horse, weapon, axe, etc. In the history of a Russian uhlan regiment from 1863, it was mentioned that in the surroundings of  after a fierce fight, the fifteen-year-old Juozas Želigovskis was taken prisoner and letters were found by his side, where his mother encouraged him to fight.

So I was not an accidental out-of-nowhere in Lithuania, but my family has a long tradition and served in the Fatherland's defence. My dream was to live with my countrymen in the Vilnius region. I did not divide them into Poles, Belarusians and Samogitians. As a Lithuanian, I never stopped being Polish. These two concepts are intertwined. They complement each other. I am talking about all this in order to prove that it was all more than a Polish general's seizure of Vilnius.Żeligowski later in his memoir which was published in London in 1943 condemned the annexation of Republic by Poland, as well as the policy of closing Belarusian schools and general disregard of Marshal Józef Piłsudski's confederation plans by Polish ally.

Later life
After the annexation of Central Lithuania to Poland, Żeligowski continued his service in the Polish Army. Promoted to three-star general in 1923, he served as an army inspector, or a commander of a military district of the capital city of Warsaw. In 1925 he also became the Polish Minister of Military Affairs. Ousted by Piłsudski's coup d'état (the May Coup), he was soon returned to the post. He retired the following year and settled in his family manor in Andrzejewo near Vilnius.

In 1930 he published a book containing his memoirs of the Polish-Bolshevik War named War of 1920: Memories and thoughts (Wojna w roku 1920. Wspomnienia i rozważania). He also wrote numerous articles on the conflicts of early 20th century for a variety of Polish newspapers. In 1935 he was elected a member of parliament and remained in the Sejm until the outbreak of World War II in 1939.

World War II and death
During the Invasion of Poland, Żeligowski volunteered for the Polish Armed Forces, but was not accepted due to his old age (he was 74 at that time) and poor health. Nevertheless, he served as an advisor to the command of the Polish southern front. After the Polish defeat, he evaded being captured by the Germans and the Soviets and managed to reach France, where he joined the Polish Government in Exile headed by General Władysław Sikorski. An active member of the Polish National Council, an advisory body, he escaped to London after the French defeat in 1940.

After the end of Second World War Żeligowski declared he would return to Poland, but he suddenly died on 9 July 1947 in London. His body was brought back to Poland, and Żeligowski was buried in the Powązki Military Cemetery in Warsaw.

Honours and awards

 Commander's Cross of the Virtuti Militari, also awarded the Silver Cross
 Grand Cross of the Polonia Restituta
 Cross of Independence with Swords (25 February 1932)
 Cross of Valour - four times
 Cross of Merit of the Army of Central Lithuania
 Commemorative Medal of the War of 1918-1921
 Medal "Decade of the Restoration of Independence" (Poland)
 Order of St. George IV class (Russian Empire)
 Order of St. Vladimir with Swords class IV (Russian Empire)
 Order of St. Anna, class II and III (Russian Empire)
 Order of St. Stanislaus, II class (Russian Empire)
 Commander's Cross of the Legion of Honour (France)
 Croix de Guerre (France)
 Golden Laurel of the Polish Academy of Literature
Honorary citizen of Warsaw

Published works
 Lucjan Żeligowski, Wojna w roku 1920: Wspomnienia I Rozwazania, Warszawa: Wydawn. Ministerstwa * Obrony Narodowej, 1990.
 Lucjan Żeligowski, O ideę słowiańską. London: F. Mildner & Sons, 1941.
 Lucjan Żeligowski, Zapomniane prawdy.  London: F. Mildner & Sons, 1941.

See also
 Central Lithuania

 Legion of Honour
 List of Legion of Honour recipients by name (Z)
 Legion of Honour Museum

References

Further reading

English

Polish 
 
 
 
 
 
 
 
 
 
 

1865 births
1947 deaths
People from Ashmyany
People from Oshmyansky Uyezd
Nonpartisan Bloc for Cooperation with the Government politicians
Members of the Sejm of the Second Polish Republic (1935–1938)
Members of the Sejm of the Second Polish Republic (1938–1939)
Polish generals
Counter-revolutionaries
Russian military leaders
Military personnel of the Russian Empire
Blue Army (Poland) personnel
People of the Russian Civil War
Polish people of the Polish–Ukrainian War
Polish people of the Polish–Soviet War
Republic of Central Lithuania
Polish independence activists
Polish anti-communists
Polish people of World War II
Commandeurs of the Légion d'honneur
Commanders of the Virtuti Militari
Grand Crosses of the Order of Polonia Restituta
Recipients of the Cross of Independence with Swords
Recipients of the Cross of Valour (Poland)
Recipients of the Order of St. Vladimir, 4th class
Recipients of the Order of St. Anna, 2nd class
Recipients of the Croix de Guerre (France)
Golden Laurel of the Polish Academy of Literature
Burials at Powązki Military Cemetery